Sacred Waters (German: An heiligen Wassern or Stürzende Wasser) is a 1932 German drama film directed by Erich Waschneck and starring Karin Hardt, Eduard von Winterstein and Hans Adalbert Schlettow. It was shot at the Tempelhof Studios in Berlin with sets designed by the art director Hans Jacoby. It is part of the heimatfilm genre. The film was based on a novel by Jakob Christoph Heer, which was later adapted into a 1960 Swiss film.

Cast
 Karin Hardt as Sabine Waldisch 
 Eduard von Winterstein as Peter Waldisch 
 Hans Adalbert Schlettow as Sepp Blattrer 
 Carl Balhaus as Josi Blattrer 
 Theodor Loos as Landowner 
 Reinhold Bernt as Töni 
 Peter Erkelenz as Engineer 
 Martha Ziegler as Fränzi Blattrer 
 Erika Dannhoff as Vroni Blattrer 
 Hans Henninger as Franz 
 Otto Kronburger as Water Technician 
 Elisabeth Wendt   
 Dorothea Thiess   
 Klaus Pohl   
 Clemens Hasse   
 Willi Schur   
 Eugen Rex   
 Gustav Rickelt

References

Bibliography
 Bergfelder, Tim & Bock, Hans-Michael. The Concise Cinegraph: Encyclopedia of German. Berghahn Books, 2009.
 Klaus, Ulrich J. Deutsche Tonfilme: Jahrgang 1932''. Klaus-Archiv, 1988.

External links

1932 films
German drama films
1930s German-language films
Films directed by Erich Waschneck
Films based on Swiss novels
Films of the Weimar Republic
Mountaineering films
Films set in the Alps
Terra Film films
German black-and-white films
1932 drama films
1930s German films
Films shot at Tempelhof Studios